Edward Trelawney (c. 1653 – October 1726), of Coldrenick, near Liskeard, Cornwall, was an English clergyman who served as dean and archdeacon of Exeter between 1717 and 1726.

Trelawney was the son of Jonathan Trelawny, gentleman of St  Germans, Cornwall, and a descendant of  Sir Jonathan Trelawny, MP of Trelawne (died 1604) who left the Coldrenick estate to his second son Edward. He matriculated at Trinity College, Oxford, on 7 April 1671, aged 18. He was awarded B.A. from Christ Church, Oxford, in 1674 and awarded M.A. in 1677.

Trelawney was appointed rector of St Tudy in 1677, and of South Hill, Cornwall, in 1691. He became a canon in 1699 and sub-dean of Exeter in 1705. In 1717 he became Dean of Exeter and Archdeacon of Exeter and remained in post until his death on 21 or 24 October 1726.  
 
Trelawney married Elizabeth Darell, daughter of Thomas Darell of Chawcroft, Hampshire and had sons Darell and Charles, who were both Members of Parliament.

Notes

1650s births
1726 deaths
Deans of Exeter
18th-century English clergy
Clergy from Cornwall